Montreal Archipelago Ecological Park (French: Parc Écologique de l’Archipel de Montréal) is a project to create a new National park within an approximate radius of  around the Island of Montreal, in Quebec, Canada. This project was announced to the public at a press conference in Montreal on October 1, 2007. In September 2008, environmental groups renewed calls for the Government of Quebec to create the park.

See also
Hochelaga Archipelago
Îles-de-Boucherville National Park

References

External links
The Green Coalition (coalition verte) website for this project
Quebec Biodiversity Atlas
Montreal Gazette article
French language article in Le Devoir newspaper
French language article in Quebec regional newspaper L'etoile
Conseil regional de l'environnement de Montreal
Communiqué de presse / Documentation Supplémentaire du Parc Écologique de l'Archipel de Montréal (French)

Parks in Montreal
Hochelaga Archipelago
Proposed infrastructure in Canada